The Chiascio is a river of Umbria, central Italy. It is a left tributary of the Tiber. It is 95 km long, and its drainage basin covers 1962 km2. Its largest tributary is the Topino, which covers 60% of its drainage basin.

References

External links 
 http://www.arpa.umbria.it/canale.asp?id=423

Rivers of the Province of Perugia
Rivers of Italy